Bjørnar Elgetun (born 1 December 1971) is a Norwegian speed skater. He was born in Lørenskog, and represented the club Søndre Høland Sportsklubb. He competed in short track speed skating at the 1994 Winter Olympics.

References

External links

1971 births
Living people
People from Lørenskog
Norwegian male short track speed skaters
Olympic short track speed skaters of Norway
Short track speed skaters at the 1994 Winter Olympics
Norwegian male speed skaters
Sportspeople from Viken (county)
20th-century Norwegian people